Capul, officially the Municipality of Capul, is a 5th class island municipality in the province of Northern Samar, Philippines. According to the 2020 census, it has a population of 12,323 people.

A lighthouse was built on the island which served as a guidepost for the Acapulco-Manila galleon trade vessels passing through the treacherous waters of San Bernardino Strait. It also served as the capital of Samar from 1848 to 1852.

Capul is the only town in the province of Northern Samar with a distinct language, Inabaknon, instead of Waray, the native language spoken by the locals of Samar island. Inabaknon is unique in it being only distantly related to the languages spoken in the entire Visayas and Luzon regions. Instead, it is classified by linguists as a Sama-Bajaw language.

History
According to oral folk history, due to their not liking of the religion of the Moros who ruled over them, a group of people and their leader Abak fled Balabac and sailed until reaching the island of Capul. Here, they established a settlement which they called Abak.

By 1610, Spanish Jesuits had arrived in the island and construction of the first church began around this period.

According to folklore, the name Capul is said to be derived from the word Acapulco, an old trading post in Mexico.

Geography
The municipality is contiguous with Capul Island, located at the southern entrance to the San Bernardino Strait.

Barangays

Capul is politically subdivided into 12 barangays.

Aguin
Jubang
Landusan
Oson
Poblacion Barangay 1
Poblacion Barangay 2
Poblacion Barangay 3
Poblacion Barangay 4
Poblacion Barangay 5
Sagaosawan
San Luis
Sawang

Climate

Demographics

Economy

Language

Capul has a different language from the rest of Northern Samar and the rest of Eastern Visayas.  The native language in the island-municipality is Inabaknon. Inabaknon has been classified by linguists as a Sama-Bajaw language closely related to those found in Mindanao, rather than a Visayan language. Nonetheless, the Capul people can speak and understand the Waray language as it is spoken by the majority of the people in Northern Samar.

Tourism

Capul Church and Fortress
The Capul Church, built during the Spanish Colonial Period, is dedicated to St. Ignatius of Loyola and is surrounded by a square fort with bulwarks of dissimilar designs.  The church structure was actually the third that was built on the site. The first two structures, made of hard wood and nipa roofs, were razed when Moro pirates plundered the island in 1615 and 1768. In 1781, Fr. Mariano Valero, a Spanish architect-priest led the restoration of the church and built the stonewall fortress similar to that in Intramuros, Manila that would fortify it against Moro attacks.

Capul Watchtower
Located on a hill near the Capul fort overlooking the town harbor, a stone watchtower was erected to serve as a sentry or warning system and a refuge for indigents during Moro raids.

Bitō Cave
Bitō Cave, also known as Beto Cave, is a popular natural attraction located in Sawang.

Timon-timon Rock
Timon-timon is a rudder-shaped rock formation located near the southern point of the island.

Capul Island Lighthouse

References

External links

 [ Philippine Standard Geographic Code]
 Philippine Census Information
 Local Governance Performance Management System

Municipalities of Northern Samar
Islands of Northern Samar
Island municipalities in the Philippines